John Alphonsus O'Halloran (27 July 1901 – 20 February 1979) was an Australian rules footballer who played with Hawthorn in the Victorian Football League (VFL).

Notes

External links 

1901 births
1979 deaths
Australian rules footballers from Victoria (Australia)
Hawthorn Football Club players